Kallu is a Finnish masculine given name that is a form of Kalle. Notable people with this name include the following:

Given name
Kallu Chidambaram (1948 – 2015), Indian film actor
Kallu Dhani Ram (born 1923), Fijian trade unionist

Surname
Malik Muhammad Waris Kallu, Pakistani politician
Shamsur Rahman Kallu, Pakistani intelligence official

See also

Kall (disambiguation)
Kalla (name)
Kalle
Kalli (name)
Kallum (given name)
Kallur (disambiguation)
Kalju (disambiguation)
Kalu (name)
Kullu (disambiguation)

Notes

Finnish masculine given names